Ammonium thiosulfate (ammonium thiosulphate in British English) is an inorganic compound with the formula . It is white crystalline solid with ammonia odor, readily soluble in water, slightly soluble in acetone and insoluble in ethanol and diethyl ether.

Production
It is produced by treating ammonium sulfite with sulfur at temperatures between 85 and 110 °C:

Applications
Ammonium thiosulfate is used in photographic fixer. It is a so-called rapid fixer, acting more quickly than sodium thiosulfate fixers. Fixation involves these chemical reactions (illustrated for silver bromide):

Ammonium thiosulfate is also used for leaching of gold and silver. It works with presence of copper as a catalyst here. This process is a nontoxic alternative gold cyanidation. The advantage to ammonium thiosulfate is that the pyrolysis of its silver complexes leaves a residue solely of silver sulfide, in contrast to complexes derived from sodium thiosulfate.

Other
Ammonium thiosulfate can be used as a fertilizer. As suggested by some research studies, it can also be used as an additive to coal-waste mixtures to reduce formation of dioxins and furans during combustion.

Safety
LD50 (oral, rat) is 2890 mg/kg.

See also 
 Thiosulfate
 Sodium thiosulfate
 Ammonium sulfate

References 

Thiosulfates
Ammonium compounds
Photographic chemicals
Gold mining
Silver mining
Inorganic fertilizers
Fuel additives